Jamai 420 is a Bengali language comedy-drama film directed by Rabi Kinnagi, was assisted by Pathikrit Basu. The film stars an ensemble cast, consisting of Soham Chakraborty, Hiran Chatterjee, Ankush Hazra, Payel Sarkar, Mimi Chakraborty and Nusrat Jahan in lead roles while Kharaj Mukherjee, Biswanath Basu, Shantilal Mukherjee and Manasi Sinha appears in pivotal roles. The film is produced jointly by Shrikant Mohta, Mahendra Soni and Nispal Singh under Shree Venkatesh Films and Surinder Films respectively. The film was released on 22 May 2015 with mostly negative reviews.

Synopsis
The film is a comedy of errors, in which three guys (Soham Chakraborty, Ankush Hazra and Hiran Chatterjee) land up in Bangkok amidst a lot of confusion over their marriage with three girls (Mimi Chakraborty, Nusrat Jahan and Payel Sarkar). They are forced to do insane things in order to woo their lady loves, which leads to many humorous situations.

Cast
 Soham Chakraborty as Shaan
 Hiran Chatterjee as Bijoy Palkiwala
 Ankush Hazra as Joy Chowdhury
 Payel Sarkar as Julie Poda
 Mimi Chakraborty as Tina Roy
 Nusrat Jahan as Priyanka Dhali
 Biswajit Chakraborty as Charandas Palkiwala, Bijoy's father
 Shankar Chakraborty as Raghav Roy, Tina's father
 Kharaj Mukherjee as Rajballabh Chowdhury, Joy's father
 Supriyo Dutta as Dhanakrishna Dhali; Priyanka's father
 Shantilal Mukherjee as Patla Poda, Julie's brother
 Biswanath Basu as Sumanta Bagdiwala
 Manasi Sinha as Priyamvada Chowdhury Joy's mother 
 Raj Chakraborty in a cameo
 Sabyasachi Chakraborty as Narrator
 Meghna Halder as Tanuka Sen
Anindita Saha as Late Bishnupriya Dhali , Only in flashback and picture, Priyanka's mother

Pallabi Mukherjee as Sumanta's mother

Production

Development

Rabi Kinagi clarified it will be a commercial romantic comedy film which would bring together Ankush Hazra, Payel, Soham Chakraborty, Hiran, Mimi Chakraborty and Nusrat Jahan on the silver screen for the first time. Raj Chakraborty made a special appearance and joined the cast in Bangkok on 16 April, for shooting.

Marketing
The film's first poster starring the lead characters as well as the first song was uploaded on 3 May 2015.

Critical response
Upam Buzarbaruah of The Times of India reviewed "Now that we are done with the pleasantries, let's start a little dissection. First, acting. All the actors in the film have managed to take hamming to the next level. Kharaj Mukherjee, Shantilal Chakraborty, Supriyo Dutta, Biswajit Chakraborty and Shankar Chakraborty are right up there, at the top. The only non-hammers were the girls in the cast and Hiran, as Ankush, Soham leave no stone unturned to act as loud as possible. But I guess that's maybe because the director wouldn't settle for less. But the result was a hamfest, with each actor trying to out-overact the others. Music. Well, can't say it's bad; just run-of-the-mill commercial stuff that makes you shake a leg for a week or so before fading into oblivion."

Soundtrack

Track list

References

External links 
 

Bengali-language Indian films
2010s Bengali-language films
2015 films
Films scored by Dabbu
Indian romantic comedy films
2015 romantic comedy films
Bengali remakes of Hindi films